Van She is the debut EP by Australian pop group Van She, released on 27  November 2005 by Modular Recordings. "Kelly" was remixed and featured in their debut album V. The UK release featured the video clip for "Kelly".

Track listing
 "Mission" – 4:25
 "Kelly" – 4:50
 "Sex City" – 4:21
 "Survive" – 3:36
 "Kelly (Reprise)" – 2:56
 "Here with You" – 4:56

Charts

References

2005 debut EPs
Modular Recordings EPs
Van She albums